Cochlops is an extinct genus of glyptodont. It lived from the Early to Middle Miocene, and its fossilized remains have been found in South America.

Description

This animal, like all glyptodonts, had an armor formed by numerous osteoderms fused together, protecting most of its body. Its skull was characterized by a shortened rostrum, a facial profile strongly inclined towards the front, and the occipital plane was oblique. The shape of its skull prefigured that of later genera such as Panochthus. Its carapace was characterized by particularly wrinkled osteoderms, especially compared to other forms of archaic glyptodonts, such as Asterostemma and Propalaehoplophorus ; some osteoderms, especially in the pelvic area, had a particular ornamentation, with a large central conical tubercle surrounded by smaller wrinkled tubercles.

Classification

The genus Cochlops was first described in 1889 by Florentino Ameghino, based on fossil remains found in Early Miocene terrains of Argentina. The type species is Cochlops muricatus, and the species C. debilis, described in 1891 by Ameghin, is also ascribed to the genus. The genus Metopotoxus was later synonymized with the genus Cochlops.

Cochlops was a basal glyptodont, belonging to the tribe Propalaehoplophorini, and related to the genera Propalaehoplophorus, Asterostemma and Eucinepeltus.

Bibliography
F. Ameghino. 1889. Contribución al conocimiento de los mamíferos fósiles de la República Argentina [Contribution to the knowledge of the fossil mammals of the Argentine Republic]. Actas de la Academia Nacional de Ciencias de la República Argentina en Córdoba 6:xxxii-1027
F. Ameghino. 1891. Nuevos restos de mamíferos fósiles descubiertos por Carlos Ameghino en el Eoceno inferior de la Patagonia austral. – Especies nuevas, adiciones y correcciones [New remains of fossil mammals discovered by Carlos Ameghino in the lower Eocene of southern Patagonia. – New species, additions, and corrections]. Revista Argentina de Historia Natural 1:289-328
S. F. Vizcaíno, J. C. Fernicola, and M. S. Bargo. 2012. Paleobiology of Santacrucian glyptodonts and armadillos (Xenarthra, Cingulata). In S. F. Vizcaíno, R. F. Kay, M. S. Bargo (eds.), Early Miocene Paleobiology in Patagonia: High-Latitude Paleocommunities of the Santa Cruz Formation 194–215

Prehistoric cingulates
Prehistoric placental genera
Miocene xenarthrans
Miocene genus first appearances
Miocene mammals of South America
Miocene genus extinctions
Neogene Argentina
Fossils of Argentina
Fossil taxa described in 1889
Golfo San Jorge Basin
Sarmiento Formation